The 2013 season is New Radiant Sports Club's 34th year in existence as a football club. New Radiant also participate in the AFC Cup this season, qualifying directly for the group stage by finishing first in the 2012 Dhivehi League.

Background
New Radiant finished as champions of last year's Dhivehi League, President's Cup and Charity Shield without losing a single game in the league. So they will be participating in the 2013 AFC Cup directly from the group stage.

Velizar Popov was announced as the new head coach on 6 January 2013 following the resignation of Mohamed Shiyaz. Mohamed Iqbal and Mohamed Nizam were named as the assistant coaches, while Ibrahim Shaaz Habeeb as the club manager. Later during the mid season, club part company with Shaaz on mutual understandings, due to his personal responsibility and other reasons.

On 13 January 2013, New Radiant announced that Imran Mohamed will replace Ahmed Thoriq as the team captain, and Ali Ashfaq and Mohamed Umair will be the team vice-captains.

Club announced their 5 new signings at the club's Gold Night. Ali Fasir returned to the Blues after a year, with Mohamed Umair, Rilwan Waheed, Moosa Yaamin and Hussain Niyaz Mohamed.

On 27 January 2013, New Radiant announced the signing of a foreign defender Sylla Mansah.

New Radiant unveiled their new set of signings, Mohamed Jazlaan, Ibrahim Ushamath and Mohamed Shifan at their Open Day.

On 20 June 2013, New Radiant signed Akram Abdul Ghanee from Club Valencia and handed over his brother Assad Abdul Ghanee's number 13 jersey to him. 3 days later on 23 June 2013, club signed Ismail Easa from Maziya. He was given his usual 15 number jersey.

On 26 June 2013, club signed Yusif Nurudeen, a Ghana under–21 international from Medeama Sporting Club on loan until the end of this season.

During the club's mid-term congress, Hassan Shujau and Mohamed Shafeeq were named as the new vice chairman of the club. And club also announced that in honour of club supporters, New Radiant will vacant the number 12 jersey from next season.

New Radiant loaned three of their youth players; Mohamed Karam, Ali Athoof and Ibrahim Waheed to the Third division side Thoddoo FC.

Kit
Supplier: MediaNet / Sponsor: Milo
State Trading Organization (STO) signed a sponsorship agreement with New Radiant on 14 February 2013. On 6 July 2013, club announced the extension of the sponsorship agreement with the main sponsor Milo to another two years.

On 31 July 2013, New Radiant signed a deal of MVR 1.4 million with Sports Power for two years (from 2014 season), with the local brand Sports Power as the club's kit provider. The current kit provider is MediaNet since 2012.

First team squad

Pre-season

Competitions

Overall

Competition record

*Draws include knockout matches decided on penalty kicks.

FA Charity Shield

AFC Cup

Group stage

New Radiant and Yangon United are tied on head-to-head record, and so are ranked by overall goal difference.

Knockout phase

Round of 16

Quarter-finals

Dhivehi League

League table

Matches

FA Cup

* Victory Sports Club withdraw from 2013 FA Cup and the match awarded New Radiant a 2–0 win.

President's Cup

See also
List of unbeaten football club seasons

References

New Radiant S.C. seasons